Kumari may refer to:

Places 
 Kumari, Nepal, a town in central Nepal
 Kumari (Afyon), a city in Turkey
 Kumari (Kutahya), a town in Turkey
 Kumari (island), an island in Estonia

Religion 
 Kumari (goddess), in Hinduism
 Kaumari, one of the Matrikas, a group of Hindu goddesses
 Devi Kanya Kumari, the virgin goddess, South India

Other uses 
 Kumari, the female form of the South Asian title and name Kumar
 Kumari (1952 film), a 1952 Tamil-language film
 Kumari (1977 film), a 1977 Nepali film
 Kumari (2022 film), a 2022 Malayalam-language film
 Kumari, an Andorian battle cruiser in the Star Trek universe
 Kumari Bank Limited, a commercial bank of Nepal

People 
 Kumari (actress) (1921–2008), Indian film actress
 Kumari Kamala (born 1934), Indian classical dancer
 Kumari Thankam (?–2011), Malayalam film actress during the 1950s
 Deepika Kumari (born 1994), Indian archer
 Eerik Kumari (1912–1984), Estonian naturalist
 Vinod Kumari, Indian politician
Jyoti Kumari, heroic Indian cyclist and recipient of Bal Puraskar 2021

See also
 Brahma Kumaris, a spiritual movement of South Asia
 Kanyakumari, a town in Tamil Nadu, South India
 Kanwari